A Mero Hajur 4 is a 2022 Nepali film directed by Jharana Thapa under the banner of Suhana Entertainment and Sunil Kumar Thapa Production. The film was released on April 14, 2022 in Nepal alongside Indian film K.G.F: Chapter 2. Filmmakers expressed grievances towards distributors for lowering the film's showtimes in order to provide more screens for K.G.F: Chapter 2. The film was made with an estimated budget of around 15 million Nepali rupees.

Synopsis 
In the midst of a chaotic world, a boy (Anmol KC) and a girl (Suhana Thapa) meet through an unprecedented event. The opposite attractions between the boy and a girl fold in an immortal love.

Cast 

 Anmol K.C.
 Suhana Thapa
 Salon Basnet
 Rabi Giri
 Pradip Raut
 Narendra Singh Dhami
 Nutan

Reception 
The film received mostly negative reviews from critics.

Abhimanyu Dixit from The Kathmandu Post commented: the director Jharana Thapa has refused to learn from the past (referring to the earlier films she directed, A Mero Hajur 2 and A Mero Hajur 3), where he criticized the story of a film. He has only praised two scenes from the entire film, and criticized everything else.

Rina Moktan from Kantipur praised Suhana Thapa, Salon Basnet, and Ravi Giri for their performances, while criticized Anmol K.C.'s acting skills. She also criticized the overall plot of the film by commenting "Only those viewers who believe Nepali films deserve to be adored will stay for the entire 2 hours, 35 minutes of this movie."

Soundtrack

References

External links

A Mero Hajur 4 at Film Development Board

Films directed by Jharana Thapa
Nepalese romantic drama films
Nepalese sequel films